The Logan Brothers Rugby League Football Club, commonly known as The leprechauns, was formed at the St Pauls Convent in 1977.

Logan Brothers competes in the Brisbane Rugby League and the Brisbane Second Division Rugby League with the club playing out of Civic Park in Logan Central, Queensland.

Notable players

Antonio Winterstein
Brad Meyers
Cameron Smith
Corey Parker
Ben Czislowski
Esi Tonga
Gerard Beale
Chris Sandow
Josh Papalii
Junior Sa'u
Lote Tuqiri
Martin Gleeson
Ricky Leutele
Ryan Tongia
William Zillman
Brenko Lee
Jaydn Su'a
George Fai
Moeaki Fotuaika

See also

References

External links

Rugby clubs established in 1977
1977 establishments in Australia
Rugby league teams in Brisbane
Logan City
Expansion of the National Rugby League